Ty Hallock (born April 30, 1971) is a former American football fullback, tight end and linebacker for the Detroit Lions, Jacksonville Jaguars and Chicago Bears.

Early life and playing career
Hallock was born in Grand Rapids, Michigan and raised in Greenville, Michigan attending Greenville High School (Michigan). Hallock played college football for Michigan State Spartans from 1989 to 1993 where he was named to the 1992 All Big Ten Conference team after 144 tackles. He was drafted by the Detroit Lions in the 1993 NFL Draft in the 7th round with the 174th overall pick. He played eight years in the NFL, playing fullback, tight end and linebacker for the Detroit Lions, Jacksonville Jaguars and Chicago Bears.

Post playing career 
Since his retirement in 2000, Ty Hallock has dabbled in media as high school football announcer and as a post game analyst for Detroit Lions games on WOOD-TV. He also coached his sons, Tanner and Tate at Forest Hills Central High School before they went on to play at Michigan State. Ty is the Vice President of Real Estate with First Companies Inc.

References 

1971 births
Living people
American football running backs
Detroit Lions players
Jacksonville Jaguars players
Chicago Bears players
Michigan State Spartans football players
Players of American football from Grand Rapids, Michigan